Floreasca Hospital is a major hospital in Bucharest, Romania. The hospital is specialized in providing emergency medical care.

History
The Floreasca Hospital is the first institution in Romania specialized in providing emergency medical care. It opened in 1933, specifically for this purpose. Initially, the hospital was funded by Nicolae Minovici, a Romanian professor.

On August 24, 1944, the hospital building was destroyed during the Bombing of Bucharest. In 1949, a new building was built for the hospital. The building, renovated several times, is still operational today.  In 1960, the building was substantially modified, and 7 new floors were added.

Floreasca today
The hospital has 760 beds for patients. It has multiple operating theaters and has sections for all the major branches of medicine, including plastic surgery, neurosurgery, and psychiatry. 

The hospital has been a pioneer for many pilot projects in the field of medicine. It has been one of the first hospitals in Romania to perform robotic surgery on a patient.

Floreasca is also a teaching hospital.

References

Hospitals in Romania
Hospital buildings completed in 1933
Hospital buildings completed in 1949